New Grosvenor Stadium and Drumbo Park is a multi-purpose stadium in Ballyskeagh, County Down, Northern Ireland. It is currently used for football matches and greyhound racing, the latter is operating under the name Drumbo Park. The stadium currently has a total capacity of 1,500 which 790 can be seated, however this is split to a capacity for football matches of 1,500 (540 seated) and a capacity of 1,000 (250 seated) for greyhound racing.

History
The stadium was built originally as a trotting venue in the village of Ballyskeagh on the outskirts of Lisburn and was acquired by Distillery Football Club and converted into a football ground in 1980.

The club named the venue New Grosvenor Park after their previous home in Belfast, which had been damaged by a fire bomb attack in 1971 and was then demolished to make way for the building of a motorway link through the city in 1972.

The stadium was modified in the mid-1980s to accommodate Greyhound Racing under the operating name of Ballyskeagh Greyhound Track, rebranded as Drumbo Park in 2009, and continues to be a duel venue accommodating both Soccer and Greyhound Racing as independent bodies.

The Stadium contains four distinct structures, two on the east side of the ground and two on the west, three of which are operated by Lisburn Distillery, the club having added Lisburn to their name in 1999, and a fourth operated solely by Drumbo Park. The two companies do not allow the shared use of their spectator facilities, meaning that the Drumbo Park stand is closed during football matches, which are advertised as taking place at New Grosvenor Park while the Morton McKnight Stand, Social Club and Visiting covered terrace are all closed during Greyhound Racing meets, which are advertised as taking place at Drumbo Park. It previously held one Irish Cup semi-final every year.

Location and Access
The Stadium is on the Ballyskeagh Road, a B route between Lisburn and Belfast at the small village of Ballyskeagh itself, situated three miles from Lisburn and one and a half miles from the village of Lambeg, where the nearest train station is located. The road is served by Ulsterbus rural services to and from Belfast-Lisburn.

The entrance to the stadium itself is marked with signs welcoming spectators to both New Grosvenor Stadium and Drumbo Park with a single lane track taking spectators to the car parking facilities.

Football

The Morton McKnight Stand
The Morton McKnight Stand is the main spectator section of the Football stadium, situated on the East side or Lambeg side of the ground and was built shortly after Lisburn Distillery acquired the venue in 1980. It covers roughly half the Lambeg side of the ground from the halfway line to the goal and is laid out in dark blue flip up plastic seating with white seats spelling out the word Whites, being the club nickname. The stand seats 527 spectators, including 25 seats in the directors box. The stand also houses a journalist's commentary box to its rear.

Lisburn Distillery Social Club and Offices
The Distillery social club and offices sit on the same side of the stadium as the Morton McKnight stand occupying the area situated on the other side of the halfway line. The facilities are situated in one building, separated from the Morton McKnight Stand by a large tarmac paddock and does not offer any terracing or seated stand, although many spectators chose to stand and watch games from the paddock situated between the facilities and the pitch. The club and offices is a two-story building containing a social club on the upper level with bar, television and a small dance floor for social events. The windows on one side of the social club are whitewashed to prevent patrons from being able to view the football from inside. The club is most commonly accessed from a fire escape, which leads spectators down to the paddock between the social club and Morton McKnight Stand. The upper floor also contains a small toilet block and executive lounge. The executive lounge is the only official spectator facility in the building and consists of a small function room with its own private bar and viewing box. The box offers seating for thirteen spectators while the lounge accommodates around thirty. The Executive lounge is open to any spectator wishing to purchase a season ticket to view matches there and also hosts the match sponsors.

The lower deck contains the club offices, boardroom, dressing rooms and player's tunnel as well as a smaller function room, which is usually only opened for matches against opponents that can generate an attendance that breaks the 1,000 mark. Irish League clubs do not officially record attendances but Lisburn Distillery receipts suggest their average attendances sit at around 300 to 400. The small function room is accessed through the club shop, which also houses a small club museum containing medals, International caps, banners, old shirts, programmes and memorabilia from the club's history.

Beside the social club is a large undeveloped paddock where the only food on offer on match days is provided by a fixed burger van.

The Visiting Covered Terrace
The covered terrace was situated on the west or Belfast side of the ground but has since been removed.

Behind the goals
Neither end of the ground has been developed and each end has been 'claimed' by the two operating companies for their use. The Ballyskeagh end of the ground is little more than a loose gravel track that takes spectators from the Lambeg side of the ground to the covered terrace on match days. The entrances to the covered terrace were situated on the Belfast side of the ground but are no longer accessible without arrangement from Drumbo Park as the Greyhound operators erected security gates outside the ground, blocking access to these entrances in 2009. Viewing of Football from here is allowed but few fans view from here as the location of the Greyhound track places the path some distance away from the goal.

The opposite end or River Lagan end for location purposes is used by the Drumbo Park greyhound facilities as the kennels and greyhound preparation area on race nights. Curiously this area is accessible from the Neil Partridge stand during Football matches but is not accessible by spectators of the Drumbo Park Greyhound Stand at its other end. As at the other end of the ground, there is no interest for spectators to view the game from behind this goal and, as this end does not provide access to the stands on the other side of the ground, remains unused during Football matches.

Greyhound Racing

History
Northern Irish greyhound tracks are unusual in the sport of greyhound racing due to the fact that they do not fall within the jurisdiction of the Greyhound Board of Great Britain. Instead the Irish Greyhound Board oversee proceedings.

A greyhound track called Ballyskeagh was constructed in May 1994 and became Belfast's only circuit following the 1996 closure of Dunmore Stadium. Distances covered were 375, 525, 550, 575, 600 & 880 yards. The Irish Greyhound Board did not fund the track and this was a major factor in the closure of the stadium to greyhound racing on 24 October 2005 after struggling for many years.

In 2010 the track re-opened with the new name of Drumbo Park, with state of the art facilities. A 350-seat grandstand restaurant took centre stage under a new era and racing takes place every Friday and Saturday. The first Northern Irish Derby was held at the track from 2011 until 2014, the event was sponsored by Bettor.com and carried a £25,000 prize, the richest ever held in Northern Ireland. The event lost some status two years later after the prize money was cut.

Although there are four structures around the track and pitch they are used independently by the football club and greyhound company which results in the football ground closing at 6.30pm and the greyhound racing opening straight after. On 11 January 2019 the greyhound racing was suspended, the reason given by the ex-Lisburn Distillery directors, John McCollum, Michael McAdam and Tommy Anderson was the difficulty in making a trading profit.

The track re-opened on 13 July 2019 under the management of 'Run With Passion Ltd' and new working practices were employed, including pre-race veterinary inspection of all runners.

Drumbo Park Stand

The Drumbo Park Stand is operated independently by Drumbo Park Greyhound Racing and is not open to spectators during Football matches, in turn this is the only area of the ground open during Greyhound Racing and is accessed from the opposite side of the stadium from the main Football facilities. This is the newest stand in the stadium, having been built in 2008 and is purpose built for Greyhound Racing with a large, indoor, glass fronted spectator restaurant making up the majority of the stand with a small spectator paddock outside to the front. The restaurant is a la carte and offers seating for 250 racegoers with Tote operators on hand for betting. Spectators need to book in advance to ensure a seat or they can stand in the front paddock, which accommodates 750 spectators and has bookmakers booths trackside.

Competitions
Northern Irish Derby

Track records
Current

Former

References

External links

 The Ulster Groundhop tour of the ground
http://www.nipremgrounds.co.uk/lisburn_distillery_football_ground/
http://blue.srv2.com/~lisburn/Lisburn%20Distillery%20FC-%20Directions%20to%20ground.html
IFCP photos from New Grosvenor Stadium
Irish Greyhound Board

Association football venues in Northern Ireland
Lisburn Distillery F.C.
Association football venues in County Down
Sports venues completed in 1980
Greyhound racing venues in the United Kingdom
1980 establishments in Northern Ireland
Greyhound racing in Ireland